Pointe-des-Cascades is a village municipality in Vaudreuil-Soulanges Regional County Municipality in the Montérégie region of Quebec, Canada. It is located on a spit of land where the St. Lawrence River flows into Lake Saint-Louis. The river has here a significant drop, forming several cascades which give the village its name.

History
Starting in the mid-seventeenth century until 1700, many military expeditions arrived at this place in order to portage around the cascades on the Saint Lawrence River. The first reference to Pointe-des-Cascades appeared in a text of Louis-Armand de Lahontan in 1684 and on a map of Deshayes in 1695, when Pointe des Cascades was included in the Vaudreuil Lordship.

In 1893, the post office opened under the English name Cascades Point (renamed in 1951 to Pointe-des-Cascades). A few years later construction began on the Soulanges Canal and when it was completed in 1899, the village became the eastern, downstream terminus of the canal. In 1958, it closed when it was superseded by the new Beauharnois Canal. The paths along the canal are now used as a regional cycling route.

In 1961, the Village Municipality of Pointe-des-Cascades was formed on the territory of the Parish Municipalities of Saint-Joseph-de-Soulanges (now Les Cèdres) and Saint-Michel-de-Vaudreuil (now part of Vaudreuil-Dorion).

Demographics 

Local government

Pointe-des-Cascades forms part of the federal electoral district of Salaberry—Suroît and has been represented by Claude DeBellefeuille of the Bloc Québécois since 2019. Provincially, Pointe-des-Cascades is part of the Soulanges electoral district and is represented by Marilyne Picard of the Coalition Avenir Québec since 2018.

List of former mayors:
 Joseph-Pierre-Amable Clément (1961–1968, 1971–1979)
 Joseph-Bruno-Germain Vallée (1968–1971)
 Joseph-Thomas-Ronald-Maurice Hayes (1979–2005)
 Francis Masse (2005–2007)
 Jean-Pierre Dupont (2007–2008)
 Maryse Morin Sauvé (2008–2013)
 Gilles Santerre (2013–2020)
 Pierre Lalonde (interim 2020)
 Peter Zytynsky (2021–present)

Education
Commission Scolaire des Trois-Lacs operates Francophone schools.

Lester B. Pearson School Board operates Anglophone schools. It is zoned to Birchwood Elementary School in Saint-Lazare and St. Patrick Elementary School in Pincourt.

See also
 List of village municipalities in Quebec

References

External links

Villages in Quebec
Incorporated places in Vaudreuil-Soulanges Regional County Municipality
Quebec populated places on the Saint Lawrence River
Greater Montreal